Hileithia is a genus of moths of the family Crambidae.

Species
Hileithia aplicalis (Guenée, 1854)
Hileithia approprialis (Dyar, 1914)
Hileithia apygalis (Guenée, 1854)
Hileithia costipunctalis Amsel, 1956 (from Venezuela)
Hileithia decostalis (Guenée, 1854)
Hileithia densalis (Dyar, 1914)
Hileithia differentialis (Dyar, 1914)
Hileithia ductalis Möschler, 1890 (from Cuba)
Hileithia edaphodrepta (Dyar, 1914)
Hileithia hohaelis (Dyar, 1914)
Hileithia invidiosa (Dyar, 1914)
Hileithia magualis (Guenée, 1854)
Hileithia nacobora (Dyar, 1914)
Hileithia obliqualis (Schaus, 1912)
Hileithia rehamalis (Dyar, 1914)
Hileithia rhealis (Druce, 1895)
Hileithia rhehabalis (Dyar, 1914)
Hileithia sparsalis (Dyar, 1914)
Hileithia terminalis (Hampson, 1912)

References

Spilomelinae
Crambidae genera